Khaimov, Chaimov, Haimov (Ḥaimov) is a Russianized Hebrew last name which means "life" (Hebrew: חיים), primarily used by the Jews of Kavkaz, also known as Mountain Jews, Bukharan Jews, and other Central Asian Jews (mostly Tajikistan and Uzbekistan).

Notable Khaimovs
 Guy Haimov (born 1986), Israeli professional association football goalkeeper
 Tamara Haimov (תמרה חיימוב), Israeli big brother contestant

Related names
 Khaimovich
 Haim

References

Jewish surnames
Russian-language surnames